Second Person Singular is a 2010 novel by the Arab Israeli writer Sayed Kashua. Kashua explores the identity of Arabs who are assimilated in Israeli culture; Arabs that speak Hebrew and had their education at Israeli institutes.

Plot
Second Person Singular follows two Arab men, a successful criminal attorney and a social worker, whose fates meet in a curious way.

The lawyer has a flourishing office in West Jerusalem where he has two fellow Arabs jurists working for him: Tariq and Samaah. Tariq also works as a criminal attorney, Samaah works as his secretary. Although Samaah studied law, her diploma from the University of Jordan is not recognized in Israel. Furthermore, the lawyer thought it would be useful to have the daughter of a high ranking Fatah member working for him.

In an effort to sustain his image as a sophisticated Israeli Arab, the lawyer visits a local bookstore every Thursday to buy novels that he read about in the literary supplement of his newspaper. On one evening, he buys a second-hand copy of Tolstoy's The Kreutzer Sonata. His wife once asked him about this book, because it was mentioned all the time during her psychology lectures on Freud. Inside he finds a small white note in Arabic in his wife's handwriting that looks like a love letter. In a blind rage over the presumed betrayal the lawyer decides to hunt down the previous owner of the book. The previous owner – named Yonathan – had his name written down on the first page of the book.

Meanwhile a second plot-line unfolds about an Arab named Amir. Amir works as a social worker in Jerusalem. One day a beautiful new intern, Laila, turns up at his office. After they go to a dance together where coincidentally all his coworkers are Amir decides to quit his job. Laila left him a note in the office explaining how she enjoyed the night and asking if he would call her back.

Amir had already taken up a second job, caring for a Jewish young man named Yonathan who is in a permanent vegetative state. Since he can't afford his rent anymore with only one job, Amir moves in with Yonathan and his mother. Amir and Yonathan look similar enough for Amir to assume Yonathan's identity. Amir uses his new Jewish identity to get into the prestigious Bezalel art school. After Yonathan dies, Yonathan is buried under Amir's name and Amir keeps the identity of Yonathan.

The lawyer's research leads him to Amir and he confronts him about his assumed identity. Laila turns out to be the wife of the lawyer. Both she and Amir, tell the same story that they never met each other after the dance. This dance took place before she and the lawyer had met. The lawyer is satisfied with the explanation and resumes his normal activity.

In the epilogue, the lawyer visits an exposition of all the graduates of the Bezalel. When he finds the photographs Amir (under Yonathan's name) made there is a photograph of a naked woman who, he would swear, was Laila.

Publication history
2010, Israel, Keter , Paperback
2012, United States, GrovePress , Pub date 3 April 2012, Translated by: Mitch Ginsburg, Hardback
2012, Netherlands, Ambo Anthos , Pub date May 2012, Translated by: Ruben Verhasselt Paperback
2013, Germany, Berlin Verlag , Pub date 14 January 2013, Translated by: Mirjam Pressler, Paperback 
2013, Italy, Neri Pozza , Translated by: Elena Loewenthal

Reception
Second Person Singular was well received, both in the Israeli and the International press.

Awards and nominations
Second Person Singular has won the Bernstein Prize in 2011.
It was shortlisted for the Sapir Prize in 2010.

References

External links

Thetower.org
Thejewishweek.com

2010 novels
21st-century Israeli novels